is a song by Japanese voice actress idol unit Earphones. It was released as fourth single on 5 October 2016 and was used as the soundtrack for 2016 PS Vita game,  Mary Skelter: Nightmares. All songs from the single were featured on their 2nd studio album, Some Dreams.

Music video
The music video for "Arakajime Ushinawareta Bokura no Ballad" was directed by Pink ja Nakutemo. The video features Earphones performed in distortion world.

Track listing

Charts

Release history

References 

Earphones (band) songs
2016 singles
2016 songs